The Rutherford Discovery Fellowships are an annual science fellowship in New Zealand. The fellowships, established in 2010, are administered by the Royal Society Te Apārangi through a competitive process. Ten fellowships are awarded nationally. The successful Fellows are announced in October/November each year.

Fellowship scheme 
The fellowships are administered by the Royal Society Te Apārangi through Terms of Reference established by the Minister of Science and Innovation, and are intended to "develop excellent researchers in New Zealand". The establishment of the scheme was funded by reprioritising funding from the existing James Cook Research Fellowships and the disestablished Foundation for Research, Science and Technology-funded Postdoctoral Fellowships. The fellowships provide up to $160,000 per annum for five years for ten researchers, and are aimed at early to mid-career researchers (three to eight years post-PhD). Applicants prepare a proposal describing their planned research at a named host institution, and a shortlist of applicants proceeds to interview. Successful Fellows are announced in October or November each year. The Fellowships are intended to be prestigious, and to "develop and foster the future leaders in the New Zealand science and innovation system by encouraging their career development and by enabling them to establish a solid track record for future research".

The Ministry of Science and Innovation commissioned a review of the scheme in 2011, following a public letter raising concerns about a gap in early and mid-career support for researchers. The review, conducted by the government Social Wellbeing Agency (The Hub), interviewed fellows, the selection panel, and representatives from host institutions and the Royal Society. A draft report is available but the final report and recommendations do not appear to have been made public.

Fellows 

Source: Royal Society Te Apārangi

References 

New Zealand science and technology awards
Royal Society of New Zealand
2010 establishments in New Zealand